Kazi Abdul Wadud Dara is an Awami League politician and the former Member of Parliament from Rajshahi-5.

Early 
Dara was born on 20 October 1962 in Rajshahi. He has a bachelors and Masters in Science.

Career
Dara was elected to Parliament in 2008 from Rajshahi-5 as a candidate of Bangladesh Awami League. Dara's supporters stuffed ballot boxes with fakes votes in a January 2009 election for chairman and vice chairman in Rajshahi. Eight of his supporters were arrested by members of Bangladesh Army from the polling station. On 5 February 2013, Dara's supporters rallied through Rajshahi with weapons following an inter-party clash. He filed cases against the Daily Prothom Alo under section 499 and 500 of the Bangladesh Penal Code for allegedly defamatory news stories.

Dara was re-elected on 5 January 2014 from Rajshahi-5 unopposed after the opposition boycotted the election. He is the Chairman of the Parliamentary Standing Committee on Ministry of Food. He failed to receive the Awami League nomination 2018 which went to Mansur Rahman.

In December 2019, Dara was appointed the President of Rajshahi District unit of Awami League.

References

Awami League politicians
Living people
9th Jatiya Sangsad members
10th Jatiya Sangsad members
1962 births
People from Rajshahi District